Coombe Country Park is a country park located in Warwickshire, England. The park is only 4.5 miles (7.5 km) east of Coventry city centre and is managed by Coventry City Council. The park has been developed from the grounds of an old Cistercian abbey, the buildings of which have now been converted into the Coombe Abbey hotel. 

In the 18th century the landscape of the park was designed by Capability Brown making it an historically important site for the region, however evidence dates back to occupation in the area to the Romans. The eldest daughter of  James VI and I, Elizabeth Stuart, Queen of Bohemia was also educated at Coombe Abbey, and there are links to Guy Fawkes and the Gunpowder Plot.

The statue in the lake, 'Fisherman and Nymph', is by Percy George Bentham.

The park now contains  of woodlands, formal gardens, arboretum, open grasslands and lake. It has a visitor centre equipped with a Cafe, Gift shop, Crafty cat ceramics and Woodturners workshops. It also has a climbing forest, bird hide, summer wild flower meadow and an extensive events programme.

References

External links

Official Coombe Country Park page on Coventry City Council website

Parks in Coventry
Country parks in Warwickshire